Tom Anderson (born 1970) is an entrepreneur and co-founder of MySpace.

Tom Anderson may also refer to:
Tom Anderson Jr. (1885–1915), Scottish-American golfer
Tom Anderson (trade unionist) (1888–1964), New Zealand seaman and trade unionist
Tom Anderson (fiddler) (1910–1991), fiddler, composer, folklorist and teacher
Tom Anderson (politician) (born 1967), former member of the Alaska State Legislature
Tom Anderson (producer), American producer and screenwriter
Ahmad Rezaee or Tom J. Anderson (1975/1976–2011), Iranian-American son of Mohsen Rezaee
Tom Anderson (footballer) (born 1993), English footballer for Doncaster Rovers
Tom Anderson (The Matrix) or Neo, a character from The Matrix
Tom Anderson, a character in Beavis and Butt-Head
Tom Anderson Guitarworks, American manufacturer of guitars and guitar pickups

Similar names 

 Cato Tom Andersen (born 1967), Norwegian former ice hockey defenceman
 Thom Andersen (born 1943), American filmmaker
 Tom Andersen, American politician

See also 
Thomas Anderson (disambiguation)
Tommy Anderson (disambiguation)